Polar Bear, Polar Bear, What Do You Hear? is a 1991 children's picture book, written by Bill Martin, Jr. and it is illustrated by Eric Carle. It was published by H. Holt.

Plot
The book is designed to help toddlers identify wild animals (from the zoo) and the noises they make. It features a polar bear, a lion, a hippopotamus, a flamingo, a zebra, a boa constrictor, an elephant, a leopard, a peacock, a walrus, a zoo keeper and some children.

This is a companion book to Brown Bear, Brown Bear, What Do You See?, published by Carle and Martin in 1967, replacing the earlier text's colours and common animals with sounds and less common animals.

See also
Brown Bear, Brown Bear, What Do You See?
Baby Bear, Baby Bear, What Do You See?
Panda Bear, Panda Bear, What Do You See?

References

1991 children's books
American picture books
Picture books by Eric Carle
Fictional polar bears
Books about bears